The 1925 Frankford Yellow Jackets season was their second in the National Football League. The team improved on their previous output of 11–2–1, winning thirteen league games to finish the season in sixth place. The team's overall record, against league and non-league opponents in 1925 was 15–7.  They set the unofficial record for most games played in a season during the years before the league went to a fixed-length schedule: they played 20 NFL games (plus at least 2 more against non-NFL opponents.)  Even counting playoff games, no NFL team has since played more than 20 games in a season.

Schedule

 Games in italics are against non-NFL teams

Standings

References

Frankford Yellow Jackets seasons
Frankford Yellow Jackets